SM Lanang Premier, also known locally as SM Lanang, is an indoor four-story shopping mall in Lanang, Davao City, Philippines along Jose P. Laurel Avenue and within S.P Dakudao loop. It is the first SM Supermall to be called "Premier". The mall is owned by Henry Sy, Sr. and managed by SM Prime Holdings. Construction of the mall started in 2011 and opened to the public on September 28, 2012, on the site of the former Lanang Golf and Country Club.

The mall has a gross floor area of  making it one of the largest shopping malls in Mindanao. The mall has 273 stores along with several restaurants. The mall has the SM Store and SM Supermarket as anchor stores. It features six cinemas, an IMAX Theater, SMX Convention Center, SM Science Discovery Center (Now closed since 2015), a bowling center, and an Al fresco dining situated along the fountain court, located at the back of the mall. SM Lanang Premier is the 4th largest taxpayer in Davao City along with SM City Davao.

History

Planning and construction 
SM Prime Holdings developed SM Lanang Premier, a Philippine-based shopping center management firm. In 2008, SM Prime Holdings bought 10 hectares out of the 40-hectare property of Lanang Golf and Country Club from Dakudao and Sons for the mall. SM Prime Holdings saw potential in the upscale northern sections of the city. The mall was to be an SM City Mall, a shopping mall with SM Store, SM Supermarket or SM Hypermarket and SM Cinemas together with retail shops, and it was scheduled to open in 2011. The management planned that the mall would be bigger than SM City Davao, the first SM Mall in Mindanao. This original plan would have generated over 1,000 jobs. Moreover, local people unofficially named the mall as SM North Davao. Officers of SM Prime Holdings requested anonymity because they could not discuss project details. The administration planned to start the mall project in January 2010. However, the management moved the start to 2011, together with SM City General Santos.

Tenant partners, retailers, food chains, service centers and merchants attended the tenant's preview of SM Lanang Premier on March 22, 2012. SM Prime Holdings announced the mall's name as SM Lanang Premier. Point Design, Inc. designed the mall. G&W Architects was the Architect of Record; NGCB was the General Contractor; D.A. Abcede and Associates was the Project Manager; Edge its Cinema Designer; Abesamis-Guerrero was the SMX Convention Center Designer, and HBO+EMTB was the Cyberzone designer.

Opening 
Eight days before it opened, SM Lanang Premier had 160 out of 273 stores occupied. The mall opened to the public on September 28, 2012. Its operating hours are from 10:00 am until 9:00 pm  A sellout crowd filled the mall during its opening, causing motorists and commuters trouble as they got stuck in heavy traffic along Jose P. Laurel Avenue.  At the time it opened, the mall's occupancy rate was 91%.

Location 
SM Lanang Premier is SM Prime Holdings' fourth mall in Mindanao after SM City Davao, SM City CDO Uptown and SM City General Santos. It is on the site of the previous Lanang Golf and Country Club in Lanang, Davao City. Additionally, S.P Dakudao loop bordered the mall and Jose P. Laurel Avenue to its north. The mall is near AH26 and R. Castillo Street, which vehicles use as an access and exit point. The mall is also near to Davao Museum.

Features

Design
Origami, the traditional Japanese art of paper folding, became the inspiration for the mall's exterior design. Thus, the mall's north, south, and west facades employed the use of  various asymmetric lines.

Operations
In March 2013, SM Lanang Premier hosted the M.I.C.E convention along with the annual Philippine Advertising Congress, accommodating 5,000 people. As of August 2013, the mall's daily foot traffic has seen 20,000 people on weekdays and 40,000 on weekends.

Economic impact
SM Lanang Premier serves as a major tourist attraction in Davao City and is the 4th largest taxpayer in the area, together with SM City Davao. As of 2013, it has an income tax return of ₱8 million. The mall employed 10,000 people in 2012. As a result of SM Lanang Premier's very strong profit and Mindanao's growing economy, SM Prime Holdings opened 2 more malls in Mindanao area, one in Butuan and a second mall in Cagayan de Oro. MegaWorld Corporation is planning to open a residential building within the mall's vicinity, with an investment amounting to ₱15 billion. SM Lanang Premier together with SM City Davao accounts for 80% of total profit of SM Prime Holdings in Mindanao.

See also
List of largest shopping malls in the world
List of largest shopping malls in the Philippines
List of shopping malls in the Philippines

Notes

References 

Shopping malls in Davao City
Shopping malls established in 2012
SM Prime
2012 establishments in the Philippines